Francisque Michot (5 October 1891 – 1 December 1968) was a French sculptor. His work was part of the sculpture event in the art competition at the 1924 Summer Olympics.

References

1891 births
1968 deaths
19th-century French sculptors
20th-century French sculptors
French male sculptors
Olympic competitors in art competitions
People from Firminy
19th-century French male artists